Cosmic Patrol is a first-person space combat game programmed by Jake Commander for the TRS-80 Model I and III, published by Instant Software in 1980.

Gameplay
Cosmic Patrol is a game in which the player pilots a Terran fighter with a mission to destroy the invading Quelons. The game is very similar to the 1978 Magnavox Odyssey² cartridge Cosmic Conflict!.

Reception
Jon Mishcon reviewed Cosmic Patrol in The Space Gamer No. 34. Mishcon commented that "If you're really into video arcade, this is a good shoot-em-up. But it's doubtful you'd spend [the price] to master this at an arcade."

Reviews
Moves #55, p31

References

External links
Review in Kilobaud Microcomputing

1980 video games
Instant Software games
Space combat simulators
TRS-80 games
TRS-80-only games
Video game clones
Video games developed in the United States